Malwina Koteluk (born 3 July 1985 in Sulechów), known by her stage name Mela Koteluk, is a Polish singer. At the beginning of her career she worked with artists such as the Scorpions and Gabriela Kulka. In 2003, she came second in a Polish song contest entitled "Pamiętamy o Osieckiej". Koteluk's debut album Spadochron was released in May 2012. In April 2013, she won the Fryderyk award in the New Face of Phonography and Author of the Year categories.

Discography

Studio albums

Singles

References

External links

 www.melakoteluk.pl

1985 births
Living people
Polish pop singers
21st-century Polish singers
21st-century Polish women singers
People from Sulechów